Md. Aminul Islam is a politician from the Dinajpur District of Bangladesh and an elected a member of parliament from Dinajpur-1.

Career 
Aminul was elected to parliament from Dinajpur-1 as a Bangladesh Awami League candidate in 1991.

References 

Living people
Year of birth missing (living people)
People from Dinajpur District, Bangladesh
Awami League politicians
5th Jatiya Sangsad members